Aphanius transgrediens, the Acı Göl toothcarp or Acipinar killifish, is a species of freshwater fish in the family Cyprinodontidae. It is endemic to the springs of Lake Acıgöl in Turkey. It is threatened by a reduction in rainfall from climate change, and the abstraction of water from the springs. The introduction of the non-native eastern mosquitofish also threatens this species.

Ecology & habitat 
Aphanius transgrediens is endemic  to Lake Acigöl, Turkey, a lake sourced from sulfurous springs (on the south-eastern margins of the lake itself), and containing sodium sulphate and other salts whose harvest is a significant economic activity in the region. Due to severe fluctuations in water levels and chemical composition, this species is mostly restricted to the margins of the lake in spring fields of varying salinity. These ponds are typically very shallow and occupied by growths of filamentous algae of the genus Chara. Winter rainfall allows migration between sites through rivulets around the periphery of the lake, causing a greater genetic diversity within populations, which extend across one square kilometer. This minor migration occurs in late summer, and in the opposite direction in early summer. It is most likely omnivorous, feeding upon aquatic invertebrates and plants. Females are batch-spawners, producing 5-11 eggs per batch on vegetation in a site defended by males. Eggs are 1.3-1.5 mm in diameter, and are laid from early spring to late autumn.

Threats 
Aphanius transgrediens occupies an extremely restricted area of 30 springs that is almost entirely endangered of destruction by the construction of a new road. Previously, the species inhabited the lake itself and its catchment and within the spring fields. In addition, A. transgrediens is threatened by invasive species, degradation of habitat (also by livestock trampling), and climate change. It is therefore assessed as critically endangered by the IUCN on criteria B1ab (i, ii, iii, iv, v) + 2ab (i, ii, iii, iv, v). Remaining conservation measures are mostly restricted to ex-situ work.

References

transgrediens
Endemic fauna of Turkey
Critically endangered animals
Taxa named by Recai Ermin
Fish described in 1946
Taxonomy articles created by Polbot